Pleuroloba costellaris, previously known as Ophicardelus costellaris, is a species of small air-breathing land snail or salt marsh snail, a terrestrial pulmonate gastropod mollusc in the family Ellobiidae.

References

 Powell A. W. B., New Zealand Mollusca, William Collins Publishers Ltd, Auckland, New Zealand 1979 

Ellobiidae
Gastropods of New Zealand
Gastropods described in 1854